No. 2 (Coastal) Operational Training Unit RAF was a training unit operated by the Royal Air Force Coastal Command. The unit started operating from late 1940 and disbanded during early 1944.

History
The unit formed on 1 October 1940 at RAF Catfoss training strike and twin engined fighter crews. The unit initially used Bristol Blenheims and Avro Ansons before these were replaced by the Bristol Beaufighter. When the demand for the aircraft reduced the training was transferred to No. 132 OTU and the unit was disbanded on 15 February 1944 at Catfoss.

Airfields used
The main airfield for the unit was RAF Catfoss however a number of different airfields were also used.

 RAF Catfoss.
 RAF Driffield.
 RAF Sherburn-in-Elmet.
 RAF Hutton Cranswick.
 RAF Lissett.

See also
List of Royal Air Force aircraft squadrons
List of Royal Air Force Operational Training Units
List of Fleet Air Arm aircraft squadrons
List of Royal Air Force units & establishments
List of Royal Air Force schools
List of Royal Air Force aircraft independent flights
List of conversion units of the Royal Air Force

References

Citations

Bibliography

Operational training units of the Royal Air Force